Diana Khodjaeva (born 26 August 1998) is a Belgian pool player. Khodjaeva represented Europe at the Atlantic Challenge Cup in 2017 against the United States team.

Career
Khodjaeva represented Europe at the 2017 Atlantic Challenge Cup, before retiring from pool until 2019, where she entered the 2019 Austria Open, winning six games and reaching the quarter-finals, before losing 7–3 to Veronika Hubrtova.

References

External links

Belgian pool players
1998 births
Living people
Female pool players
Place of birth missing (living people)
20th-century Belgian women
21st-century Belgian women